Giovanni Picca (14 February 1840 – 1910) was an Italian painter and scenographer.

Biography
He was born and resident at Ascoli Piceno. He studied while very young in Rome and other places. He has painted scenes for many theaters, among them the Teatro Ventidio Basso of Ascoli, and the theaters of Foligno and Perugia. He also has worked in the decoration of palace ceilings and walls, including the ceiling of the vestibule in the Theater of Monte Giorgio. He painted the frescoes of the Caffè Meletti in Ascoli Piceno.

References

1840 births
1910 deaths
People from Ascoli Piceno
19th-century Italian painters
Italian male painters
20th-century Italian painters
Italian scenic designers
19th-century Italian male artists
20th-century Italian male artists